BL1 could refer to:
 BL1, a postcode district in the BL postcode area
 Biosafety Level 1
 The EMD BL1, predecessor to the EMD BL2 locomotive